Villa Aurore is a novel written in French by French Nobel laureate J. M. G. Le Clézio.

Publication history

Nouvelle Revue Française
Nouvelle Revue Française, 350, mars: 30–50.1982

First French Edition

Other French language Edition

References

1999 French novels
Novels by J. M. G. Le Clézio
Works by J. M. G. Le Clézio
French novellas
Éditions Gallimard books